Malta competed in their ninth Commonwealth Games in 2002 sending 13 male and 4 female athletes  to compete in Athletics, Shooting, Swimming, Triathlon, Weightlifting and Wrestling.
The nation gained their only medal in the men's Double Trap Shooting, a bronze. This was the second time Malta had won a medal at the games, their first coming in Auckland in 1990.

Bronze
Shooting:
 William Chetcuti Men's Double Trap Shooting

See also
2002 Commonwealth Games results

References

2002
2002 in Maltese sport
Nations at the 2002 Commonwealth Games